The Marine Drive Tunnel is tunnel, currently under construction, which will connect Marine Drive in Kollupitiya to the Colombo International Financial City (CIFC). The Cabinet of Sri Lanka has approved the signing of the MOU in January 2018.

Route 
The tunnel would begin at the northern-end of Marine Drive, before connecting to the CIFC after passing under Galle Face Green. Preliminary assessments were completed to further extend the road connection to the Colombo Harbour and the New Kelani Bridge, where the existing E03 expressway begins, before terminating at the Bandaranaike International Airport. The extension may be built as a continuation of the tunnel or as an elevated highway. The construction of the tunnel will also further expand the Galle Face Green towards the ocean.

See also 
 Expressways of Sri Lanka

References

External links 
 
 

Road tunnels in Sri Lanka
Transport in Colombo